The 1963 British Columbia general election was the 27th general election in the Province of British Columbia, Canada. It was held to elect members of the Legislative Assembly of British Columbia. The election  was called on August 22, 1963, and held on September 30, 1963.  The new legislature met for the first time on January 23, 1964.

The conservative Social Credit Party of Premier W.A.C. Bennett was re-elected with a majority in the legislature to a fifth term in government. The party increased its share of the popular vote and number of seats in the legislature marginally.

The opposition New Democratic Party (formerly the Cooperative Commonwealth Federation) had small losses both in popular vote and number of seats.

The Liberals won about 20% of the popular vote, and one additional seat, for a total of five.

The Progressive Conservative Party won no seats in the legislature increasing its share of the popular vote by four-and-half percentage points to over 11%.

Results

Note:

* Party did not nominate candidates in the previous election.

Results by riding

|-
||    
|align="center"|William Collins Speare
|align="center"  |Cariboo<small>Social Credit
||    
||    
|align="center"  |Alberni<small>New Democrat
|align="center"|Stanley John Squire
||    
|-
||    
|align="center"|William Kenneth Kiernan
|align="center"  |Chilliwack<small>Social Credit
||    
||    
|align="center"  |Atlin<small>New Democrat
|align="center"|Frank Arthur Calder
||    
|-
||    
|align="center"|James Roland Chabot
|align="center"  |Columbia<small>Social Credit
||    
||    
|align="center" rowspan=2 |Burnaby<small>New Democrat
|align="center"|Gordon Dowding
||    
|-
||    
|align="center"|Daniel Robert John Campbell
|align="center"  |Comox<small>Social Credit
||    
||    
|align="center"|Charles Willoughby MacSorley
||    
|-
||    
|align="center"|Ernest A. LeCours
|align="center" rowspan=2 |Delta<small>Social Credit
||    
||    
|align="center"  |Cowichan-Newcastle<small>New Democrat
|align="center"|Robert Martin Strachan2
||    
|-
||    
|align="center"|Hunter Bertram Vogel
||    
||    
|align="center"  |Cranbrook<small>New Democrat
|align="center"|Leo Thomas Nimsick
||    
|-
||    
|align="center"|Herbert Joseph Bruch
|align="center"  |Esquimalt<small>Social Credit
||    
||    
|align="center"  |Dewdney<small>New Democrat
|align="center"|Dave Barrett
||    
|-
||    
|align="center"|Ray Gillis Williston
|align="center"  |Fort George<small>Social Credit
||    
||    
|align="center"  |Grand Forks-Greenwood<small>New Democrat
|align="center"|Lois Haggen
||    
|-
||    
|align="center"|Philip Arthur Gaglardi<small>
|align="center"  |Kamloops<small>Social Credit
||    
||    
|align="center"  |Kaslo-Slocan<small>New Democrat
|align="center"|Randolph Harding
||    
|-
||    
|align="center"|Donald Frederick Robinson
|align="center"  |Lillooet<small>Social Credit
||    
||    
|align="center"  |Mackenzie<small>New Democrat
|align="center"|Anthony John Gargrave
||    
|-
||    
|align="center"|Wesley Drewett Black
|align="center"  |Nelson-Creston<small>Social Credit
||    
||    
|align="center"  |Nanaimo and the Islands<small>New Democrat
|align="center"|David Stupich
||    
|-
||    
|align="center"|George William McLeod
|align="center"  |North Okanagan<small>Social Credit
||    
||    
|align="center"  |New Westminster<small>New Democrat
|align="center"|Rae Eddie
||    
|-
||    
|align="center"|Jacob Francis Huhn
|align="center"  |North Peace River<small>Social Credit
||    
||    
|align="center" rowspan=2 |Vancouver East<small>New Democrat
|align="center"|Alexander Barrett MacDonald
||    
|-
||    
|align="center"|Cyril Morley Shelford
|align="center"  |Omineca<small>Social Credit
||    
||    
|align="center"|Arthur James Turner  
||    
|-
||    
|align="center"|William Harvey Murray
|align="center"  |Prince Rupert<small>Social Credit
||    
||    
|align="center"  |Yale<small>New Democrat
|align="center"|William Leonard Hartley  
||    
|-
||    
|align="center"|Arvid Lundell
|align="center"  |Revelstoke<small>Social Credit
||    
||    
|align="center"  |Fernie<small>Liberal
|align="center"|Henry Cartmell (Harry) McKay
||    
|-
||    
|align="center"|Donald Leslie Brothers
|align="center"  |Rossland-Trail<small>Social Credit
||    
||    
|align="center" rowspan=2 |North Vancouver<small>Liberal
|align="center"|James Gordon Gibson
||    
|-
||    
|align="center"|John Douglas Tidball Tisdalle
|align="center"  |Saanich<small>Social Credit
||    
||    
|align="center"|Ray Perrault
||    
|-
||    
|align="center"|Willis Franklin Jefcoat
|align="center"  |Salmon Arm<small>Social Credit
||    
||    
|align="center"  |Oak Bay<small>Liberal
|align="center"|Alan Brock MacFarlane
||    
|-
||    
|align="center"|Frank Richter, Jr.<small>
|align="center"  |Similkameen<small>Social Credit
||    
||    
|align="center"  |Vancouver-Point Grey<small>Liberal
|align="center"|Patrick Lucey McGeer
||    
|-
||    
|align="center"|Dudley George Little
|align="center"  |Skeena<small>Social Credit
||    
|-
||    
|align="center"|William Andrew Cecil Bennett1
|align="center"  |South Okanagan<small>Social Credit
||    
|-
||    
|align="center"|Stanley Carnell<small>
|align="center"  |South Peace River<small>Social Credit
||    
|-
||    
|align="center"|Eric Charles Fitzgerald Martin<small>
|align="center" rowspan=2 |Vancouver-Burrard<small>Social Credit
||    
|-
||    
|align="center"|Bert Price<small>
||    
|-
||    
|align="center"|Alexander Small Matthew
|align="center" rowspan=2  |Vancouver Centre<small>Social Credit
||    
|-
||    
|align="center"|Leslie Raymond Peterson
||    
|-
||    
|align="center"|Robert William Bonner
|align="center" rowspan=2 |Vancouver-Point Grey<small>Social Credit
||    
|-
||    
|align="center"|Ralph Raymond Loffmark
||    
|-
||    
|align="center"|William Neelands Chant
|align="center" rowspan=3 |Victoria City<small>Social Credit
||    
|-
||    
|align="center"|Waldo McTavish Skillings
||    
|-
||    
|align="center"|John Donald Smith
||    
|-
|
|align="center"|1 Premier-Elect
|align="center"|2 Leader of the Opposition
|-
|-
| align="center" colspan="10"|Source:''' Elections BC
|-
|}

See also
List of British Columbia political parties

Further reading
 

1963
British Columbia
1963 in British Columbia
September 1963 events in Canada